Yutanigawa Dam is a rockfill dam located in Toyama prefecture in Japan. The dam is used for irrigation. The catchment area of the dam is 4.2 km2. The dam impounds about 11  ha of land when full and can store 1636 thousand cubic meters of water. The construction of the dam was started on 1977 and completed in 2000.

References

Dams in Toyama Prefecture
2000 establishments in Japan